The Mysore–Kochuveli Express is an Express train belonging to Southern Railway zone that runs between  and  of Thiruvananthapuram the capital of Kerala in India. It is currently being operated with 16315/16316 train numbers on a daily basis. This train was introduced  as a result  of many protests by Kerala passengers  for a second train between TRIVANDRUM and BANGALORE.This train is the successor of TRIVANDRUM CENTRAL BANGALORE WEEKLY EXPRESS.

Service

The 16315 Mysore–Kochuveli Express has an average speed of 46 km/hr and covers 961 km in 20 hours 45 minutes. The 16316 Kochuveli–Mysore Express has an average speed of 52 km/hr and covers 961 km in 18 hours 35 minutes.

Route and halts 

The important halts of the train are:

 
Mandya
Ramanagaram
Kangeri

Coach composition

The train has LHB rakes with a maximum permissible speed of 130 kmph. The train consists of 22 coaches:

 1 AC II Tier
 3 AC III Tier
 13 Sleeper coaches
 3 General Unreserved
 2 EOG

LHB rakes are allotted with effect from 28-07-2018. India Rail Info

Traction

Both trains are hauled by Royapuram-based WAP-7 electric locomotives from Mysore Junction to Kochuveli, and vice versa.

Timetable 

16315 – Starts from Mysore daily at 12:50 hrs IST and reaches Kochuveli next day at 9:35 AM IST
16316 – Starts from Kochuveli daily at 16:45 hrs IST and reaches Mysore next day at 11:20 Hrs IST

See also 

 Yesvantpur–Kochuveli AC Express
 Kochuveli–Yesvantpur Garib Rath Express
 Kochuveli–SMVT Bengaluru Humsafar Express

Notes

References

External links 

 16315/KSR Bengaluru - Kochuveli Express India Rail Info
 16316/Kochuveli - KSR Bengaluru Express India Rail Info

Transport in Bangalore
Transport in Thiruvananthapuram
Express trains in India
Rail transport in Karnataka
Rail transport in Kerala
Railway services introduced in 1996